In the fictional universe of Warhammer 40,000, the Space Marines, also known as the Adeptus Astartes, are superhuman warrior-monks who fight for the Imperium of Man. They wear mechanised suits of armour and have modified genomes that grant them superhuman strength and endurance. Some Space Marines have betrayed the Imperium and serve the Gods of Chaos, and are thus known as Chaos Space Marines.

Warhammer 40,000 is a miniature wargame, where Space Marines are one of the playable factions that can be used. They are the most well-known and popular characters in Warhammer 40,000, always featuring in the artwork and starter set of each edition of Warhammer 40,000 and other spin-off games such as Space Hulk and Epic (excluding the 2nd edition Titan Legions), and simpler derivative games such as Space Crusade. Likewise, they are the most popular protagonists in spin-off fiction such as novels and video games.

Publication history

Space Marines were first introduced in Warhammer 40,000: Rogue Trader (1987) by Rick Priestley, which was the first edition of the tabletop game.

The book Realm of Chaos: The Lost and the Damned (Rick Priestley and Bryan Ansell, 1990) was the first book from Games Workshop to give a backstory for the Space Marines.  It introduced the original 20 Space Marine Legions as well as their Primarchs. It also first described the Horus Heresy, the civil war of the 30th millennium in which nine of the Legions converted to the worship of the Chaos Gods and rebelled against the Emperor.

Two of the original 20 Legions and their respective Primarchs are not named and are described as "redacted" from the records of the Imperium. Rick Priestley explained that this was to illustrate the Imperium's practice of erasing embarrassing or incriminating events and figures from Imperial records (damnatio memoriae).

Tabletop games
The following tabletop games from Games Workshop use miniature models of Space Marines:

Warhammer 40,000
Kill Team
Space Hulk (discontinued)
Space Crusade (discontinued)
Epic: Armageddon (discontinued)

Miniature design

Bob Naismith created the initial design for the Space Marines. The first edition's Space Marines had helmets with prominent conical snouts. This design is popularly known as the "beaky" helmet. The design of the helmet initially had a gas mask, with an airtube connected to the snout, and this concept is apparent in a 1991 limited edition model that is based on this initial design. The designers at Games Workshop felt that this concept was too banal and derivative, and they made a conscious decision to give the Space Marine, and Warhammer 40,000 in general, a "medieval-in-space" aesthetic. The helmet was modified to resemble a medieval hounskull helmet. Likewise, the Space Marine's armour was redesigned to resemble medieval plate armour. Jes Goodwin redesigned the armour for the second edition (1993), where the helmet's beak was replaced by a flat grill, and the chestplate features a winged skull. With the eighth edition (2017), Games Workshop introduced the Primaris Space Marine models which are slightly taller and have a new helmet design.

Space Marine Terminators first appeared in 1989 for the spin-off board game Space Hulk and were eventually incorporated into the principal Warhammer 40,000 game. They wear a bulkier kind of armour and carry heavier weapons.

Simplified miniatures of Space Marines in Power Armour, Space Marine Scouts, and Space Marine Terminators are found in the board games Space Crusade and Tyranid Attack.

Warhammer 40,000
As far as non-hero infantry go, Space Marines are rather powerful and have a high point cost. A Space Marine Intercessor is worth 20 points, whereas a normal human soldier is worth only 4 points. Consequently, an army based on Space Marines will be relatively small compared to, say, a Tyranid army of equal strength. This means that a player can assemble a functional army for relatively little money and effort. In terms of playing style, a Space Marine army neither excels nor fails at any particular tactic, though certain Chapters do have variant rules (e.g. the Salamanders specialise in flamethrowers). Individual units are typically not strongly specialised and can roughly substitute in other roles, meaning most mistakes and setbacks are easy to compensate for. Their tough armour and generally unspecialised weaponry means that they do not have to be maneuvered as carefully as units of other armies (such as the powerful but frail Aeldari). These qualities make them ideal for beginners, and may help them succeed more often in their early gameplay stages.

Kill Team
Much like in Warhammer 40,000, Space Marine teams in Kill Team tend to be small teams of powerful warriors. For instance, a Space Marine team will consist of five warriors, whereas an Imperial Guard team will consist of 10 to 14 warriors.

Space Hulk
In Space Hulk, Space Marines in Terminator armour move through narrow corridors fending off attacks by alien monsters known as "genestealers". The genestealers move fast and are very deadly in melee combat, whereas the Space Marines move slowly and are weak in melee combat but possess firearms.

Fictional characteristics
A Space Marine is stronger, tougher, heavier and taller than a normal human due to genetic augmentation. Space Marines wear suits of mechanised armour which have a medieval aesthetic, and they are often brightly painted and ornately decorated (camouflage is mostly redundant in warfare of the far future). The classic weapon of the Space Marine is the boltgun, which fires small rocket-assisted rounds and has such powerful recoil that it cannot be safely wielded by a normal human. Space Marines can live for centuries and thereby develop vast combat experience.

Those Space Marines who are loyal to the Imperium are organised into "Chapters", each usually containing about a thousand Space Marines, led by a Chapter Master. Each Chapter is an autonomous organization and controls a fiefdom from which it raises funds and recruits. Each Space Marine Chapter is a fully integrated military force, possessing both naval ships and ground forces. The Space Marines themselves are dedicated shock troops, while ordinary human serfs serve in support roles such as crewing their ships and maintaining their equipment. A Chapter's headquarters is called the "fortress-monastery". Each Chapter bears a name, such as "the Iron Hands" and "the Dark Angels", and a distinctive paint scheme for their armour (e.g. the White Scars paint their armour white). A Space Marine's commitment to his Chapter is lifelong and they rarely have any kind of personal life outside the Chapter. Space Marines are conditioned to have a fanatical reverence for the Emperor of Mankind.

Chaos Space Marines are organised into large "Legions" and smaller warbands that likewise have colourful names (e.g. "the Thousand Sons" and "the Night Lords"). Some Chaos Space Marines dedicate themselves to a specific Chaos God, which affects their personalities and physiologies in specific ways. For instance, Chaos Space Marines devoted to Nurgle have grotesque, bloated bodies riddled with disease, yet are paradoxically very resilient in battle; and Chaos Space Marines devoted to Slaanesh tend to be hedonistic. Chaos Space Marines tend to be even more brutal than their Loyalist counterparts, often killing and torturing people for the mere sake of it.

A Space Marine is created by implanting "gene-seed" in a human recruit, which transforms them into superhumans. Gene-seed cannot be mass-produced in factories. New gene-seed grows within the bodies of the Space Marines themselves and are periodically harvested by surgery to implant in new recruits. Space Marines also cannot procreate sexually as humans normally do as their genetic modifications make them sterile. Because their production cannot be scaled up, Space Marines are few in number. The vast majority of the Imperium's armed forces are regular humans.

Space Marines are always male, as gene-seed will kill a woman if implanted. Most chapters prefer to recruit boys in early adolescence, as younger recruits suffer fewer complications in the transformation process; but adults can be recruited up to middle age.

The Emperor of Mankind created the Space Marines around the time he founded the Imperium and used them to spearhead his conquest of the galaxy. A few centuries into this campaign, known as the "Great Crusade", about half of the Space Marine legions converted to the worship of the Chaos Gods and rebelled against the Emperor in what became known as the "Horus Heresy". The insurrection was eventually defeated and the survivors fled Imperial space. Because Space Marines age at a much slower rate than normal humans, and most of the rebels dwell in realms of Chaos that are outside the normal flow of time, many of the Chaos Space Marines that fled during after the Heresy are alive and continue to wage war against the Imperium over ten thousand years later.

Primaris Space Marines
The 8th edition of Warhammer 40,000, released in 2017, introduces Primaris Space Marines, which are larger and more resilient than standard Space Marines. Roboute Guilliman, the Primarch (genetic "father") of the original Ultramarines Legion and creator of the "Codex Astartes" (the rules that dictated the creation of Space Marine Chapters), had sanctioned the creation of a new generation of Space Marines following the events of the Horus Heresy. Ten thousand years later, upon Guilliman's resurrection, Legions of Primaris were introduced into the Imperial forces, both to augment the existing Chapters and to create new Chapters.

Films
Ultramarines: A Warhammer 40,000 Movie (2010).
Astartes

Books

Space Marines are featured in numerous Science-fantasy novels, predominantly published by Black Library, a division of Games Workshop.

Trademark controversy

In December 2012, Games Workshop claimed that any use of the phrase "Space Marine" on content other than their own infringed on their trademark of the term and requested that online retailer Amazon remove the e-book Spots the Space Marine by M.C.A. Hogarth. The row received a lot of publicity during February 2013, with authors such as Cory Doctorow, Charles Stross, and John Scalzi supporting Hogarth. Amazon restored the e-book for sale.

See also
Supersoldier
Space marine

Notes

References

Bibliography

 
 
 
 Priestley, Rick, Warhammer 40,000 Rogue Trader, Games Workshop, Nottingham, 1987, 
 Warhammer 40,000 5th edition rule book, Games Workshop, Nottingham 2008
 

Imperium (Warhammer 40,000)
Fictional genetically engineered characters
Human-derived fictional species
Space marines
Fictional characters with gigantism
Fictional characters with superhuman strength
Fictional super soldiers
Fictional warrior races
Fictional monks
Fictional military organizations

fi:Warhammer-universumi#Space Marines